A message stick is a communication device traditionally used by Aboriginal Australians. The objects were carried by messengers over long distances and were used for reinforcing a verbal message. Although styles vary, they are generally oblong lengths of wood with motifs engraved on all sides. They have traditionally been used across continental Australia, to convey messages between Aboriginal nations, clans and language groups and even within clans. In the 1880s, they became objects of anthropological study, but there has been little research on them published since then. Message sticks are non-restricted since they were intended to be seen by others, often from a distance. They are nonetheless frequently mistaken for tjurungas.

Description and use
Styles vary, but they are usually a cylindrical or slightly flattened shape.

Traditionally, message sticks were passed between different peoples, language groups and even within clans to establish information and transmit messages. They were often used to invite neighboring groups to corroborees, marriages, burials, declarations of war and ball games. Identifying marks inscribed into the stick would convey the relationship. When messengers entered another group’s country, they would first announce their presence with smoke signals, so that they would be taken safely with the message stick to the Aboriginal elders, to whom they would speak their message.

They were sometimes referred to as talking-sticks or stick-letters, according to Robert Hamilton Mathews in 1897.

The messenger carrying the stick was granted a kind of diplomatic immunity and guaranteed safe passage into another group's territory.

Historical accounts
Anthropologist Alfred Howitt wrote of the Wurundjeri people of the Melbourne area in 1889:

Jeannie Gunn wrote about life at a station near the site of the  town of Mataranka in the Northern Territory in 1902:

Donald Thomson, recounting his journey to Arnhem Land after the Caledon Bay Crisis in 1935, writes of Wonggu sending a message stick to his sons, at that time in prison, to indicate a calling of a truce. In etched angles, it showed people sitting down together, with Wonggu at the centre, keeping the peace. The sticks acquired a function as a tool of diplomacy, especially in Northern Australia.

Modern cultural references
Message Stick was an Australian TV series.
The student newspaper of the University of New South Wales goes by the name Tharunka, which means message stick in a Central Australian dialect.
Message Stick is a business owned by Aboriginal Australians, started in 2003. It works closely with the Federal Government to influence Government policy to support economic development, including business ownership and entrepreneurialism.

See also

Devil's Pool, Australia
Koori Mail
National Indigenous Times Australia's largest circulating Indigenous affairs newspaper
Australian Aboriginal artefacts

References

Further reading
Allen L (2015) Message sticks and Indigenous diplomacy. In: K. Darian-Smith, P. Edmonds  (eds). Conciliation on Colonial Frontiers: Conflict, Performance and Commemoration in Australia and the Pacific Rim. New York: Taylor & Francis, 113–131.
Bastian, A. (1880) Message-sticks der Australie. Verhandlungen der Berliner Anthropologischer Gesellschaft 240–242.
Bastian, A. (1881) Australische Schriftsubstitute. Zeitschrift für Ethnologie Transactions 13:192–193.
Edye, I.G. (1903) Aboriginal message sticks. Science of Man 5(12): 197–198.
Hamlyn, Harris R. (1918) On messages and ‘message sticks’ employed among the Queensland Aborigines. Memoirs of the Queensland Museum 6: 13–36.
Howitt, A.W. (1889). Notes on Australian message sticks and messengers. Journal of the Anthropological Institute of Great Britain and Ireland 18: 314–332.
Kelly, Piers. 2019. Australian message sticks: Old questions, new directions. Journal of Material Culture 1-20.Online First
Mountford, C.P. (1938). Aboriginal message sticks from the Nullabor Plains. Transactions of the Royal Society of South Australia 62(1): 122–126.
Thorpe, W.W. (1926). Aboriginal message sticks. Australian Museum Magazine 2(12): 423–425.

External links
Australian Message Sticks Database 

Australian Aboriginal culture
Human communication
Nonverbal communication
Postal systems